"Stick It Out" is a song and single by the band Rush from their 1993 album Counterparts. The song debuted at number one on the Billboard Album Rock Tracks chart, becoming the band's only number one debut of their five chart-toppers. The song also reached number one on the RPM Cancon chart.

A music video was made for the song. It was briefly featured on an episode of Beavis and Butt-Head. "Stick It Out" has been featured live on several of Rush's tours, including the Counterparts, Test for Echo, and Time Machine Tours.

Background
Drummer and lyricist Neil Peart said of the song: It’s just a play on the words, really. "Stick It Out" meaning both a kind of arrogant display, 'stick it out', but also the endurance thing; if you have a difficult thing to endure, stick it out and you get to the end. It was the pun on both of those, really, so again the duality in the song is a bit leaning both ways. The sense of forbearance, of holding back, and also the idea of fortitude: stick it out, you know, survive.

But that was more of a piece of fun. That song, I would say, both lyrically and musically, verges on parody, and that was one I think we just had fun with, and lyrically I certainly did, too. 'Stick it out' and 'spit it out' and all that was just a bit of word play.

Lead singer and bassist Geddy Lee said: I love the riff. It’s a great riff song. I love playing it, and it’s a very bass-heavy song, which always makes me happy. Lyrically, it’s kind of so-so. I don’t know. I think the best thing about it is the vibe and that it’s stripped down to a trio, back to doing riff rock.

Track listing

Personnel
 Geddy Lee – bass guitar, vocals, synthesizer
 Alex Lifeson – guitars
 Neil Peart – drums, percussion

See also
List of Rush songs
List of Billboard Mainstream Rock number-one songs of the 1990s

References

1993 songs
1993 singles
Rush (band) songs
Music videos directed by Samuel Bayer
Song recordings produced by Peter Collins (record producer)
Songs written by Neil Peart
Songs written by Alex Lifeson
Songs written by Geddy Lee
Atlantic Records singles
Grunge songs